The Cyprus women's national football team represents Cyprus in international women's football.

Team image

Home stadium
The Cyprus women's national football team plays their home matches on the Makario Stadium.

Results and fixtures

The following is a list of match results in the last 12 months, as well as any future matches that have been scheduled.

Legend

2022

2023

Coaching staff

Current coaching staff

Manager history

Aggelos Tsolakis (????–)

Players

Caps and goals may be incorrect.

Current squad
 The following players were called up for the match against the Netherlands on 8 April 2022.
 Caps and goals accurate up to and including 28 July 2022.

Recent call ups
 The following players have been called up to a Cyprus squad in the past 12 months.

Records

 Active players in bold, statistics correct as of 2020.

Most capped players

Top goalscorers

Competitive record

FIFA Women's World Cup

*Draws include knockout matches decided on penalty kicks.

UEFA Women's Championship

*Draws include knockout matches decided on penalty kicks.

See also

Sport in Cyprus
Football in Cyprus
Women's football in Cyprus
Cyprus women's national under-20 football team
Cyprus women's national under-17 football team
Cyprus men's national football team

References

External links
Cyprus women's national football team – official website at CFA 

 
Women's football in Cyprus
European women's national association football teams